Collide is the fifth studio album by the Milwaukee-based rock band The Gufs.

Track listing
All tracks by The Gufs

"Belong"
"Someday Daughter"
"Wearing Thin"
"Waiting"
"Emily"
"For a Ride" (acoustic)
"Forever and a Day"
"Track"

Personnel
 Goran Kralj – lead vocals
 Dejan Kralj – bass guitar
 Morgan Dawley – lead guitar, backup vocals
 Scott Schwebel – drums
 Brian Pettit - percussion

External links
 The Gufs Official Website

Notes

1990 albums
The Gufs albums